In number theory, Mills' constant is defined as the smallest positive real number A such that the floor function of the double exponential function

is a prime number for all natural numbers n. This constant is named after William Harold Mills who proved in 1947 the existence of A based on results of Guido Hoheisel and Albert Ingham on the prime gaps. Its value is unproven, but if the Riemann hypothesis is true, it is approximately 1.3063778838630806904686144926... .

Mills primes
The primes generated by Mills' constant are known as Mills primes; if the Riemann hypothesis is true, the sequence begins

 .

In order to ensure that rounding , for n = 1, 2, 3, …, produces this sequence of primes, it must be the case that . The Hoheisel–Ingham results guarantee that there exists a prime between any two sufficiently large cube numbers, which is sufficient to prove this inequality if we start from a sufficiently large first prime . The Riemann hypothesis implies that there exists a prime between any two consecutive cubes, allowing the sufficiently large condition to be removed, and allowing the sequence of Mills primes to begin at a1 = 2.

This upper bound is much too large to be practical, as it is infeasible to check every number below that figure. However, the value of Mills' constant can be verified by calculating the first prime in the sequence that is greater than that figure.

As of April 2017, the 11th number in the sequence is the largest one that has been proved prime. It is

and has 20562 digits.

, the largest known Mills probable prime (under the Riemann hypothesis) is

, which is 555,154 digits long.

Numerical calculation
By calculating the sequence of Mills primes, one can approximate Mills' constant as

Caldwell and Cheng used this method to compute 6850 base 10 digits of Mills' constant under the assumption that the Riemann hypothesis is true. There is no closed-form formula known for Mills' constant, and it is not even known whether this number is rational.

Fractional representations
Below are fractions which approximate Mills' constant, listed in order of increasing accuracy (with continued-fraction convergents in bold) :

1/1, 3/2, 4/3, 9/7, 13/10, 17/13, 47/36, 64/49, 81/62, 145/111, 226/173, 307/235, 840/643, 1147/878, 3134/2399, 4281/3277, 5428/4155, 6575/5033, 12003/9188, 221482/169539, 233485/178727, 245488/187915, 257491/197103, 269494/206291, 281497/215479, 293500/224667, 305503/233855, 317506/243043, 329509/252231, 341512/261419, 353515/270607, 365518/279795, 377521/288983, 389524/298171, 401527/307359, 413530/316547, 425533/325735, 4692866/3592273, 5118399/3918008, 5543932/4243743, 5969465/4569478, 6394998/4895213, 6820531/5220948, 7246064/5546683,7671597/5872418, 8097130/6198153, 8522663/6523888, 8948196/6849623, 9373729/7175358, 27695654/21200339, 37069383/28375697, 46443112/35551055, 148703065/113828523, 195146177/149379578, 241589289/184930633, 436735466/334310211, 1115060221/853551055, 1551795687/1187861266, 1988531153/1522171477, 3540326840/2710032743, 33414737247/25578155953, ...

Generalisations
There is nothing special about the middle exponent value of 3. It is possible to produce similar prime-generating functions for different middle exponent values. In fact, for any real number above 2.106..., it is possible to find a different constant A that will work with this middle exponent to always produce primes.  Moreover, if Legendre's conjecture is true, the middle exponent can be replaced with value 2 .

Matomäki showed unconditionally (without assuming Legendre's conjecture) the existence of a (possibly large) constant A such that  is prime for all n.

Additionally, Tóth proved that the floor function in the formula could be replaced with the ceiling function, so that there exists a constant  such that 

In the case , the value of the constant  begins with 1.24055470525201424067... The first few primes generated are:

Without assuming the Riemann hypothesis, Elsholtz proved that  is prime for all positive integers , where , and that  is prime for all positive integers , where .

See also
Formula for primes

References

Further reading

External links
 
 Who remembers the Mills number?, E. Kowalski.
 Awesome Prime Number Constant, Numberphile.

Mathematical constants
Prime numbers